Booker T. Washington High School refers to several schools in the United States named after the African-American education pioneer Booker T. Washington:

 Booker T. Washington Magnet High School (Montgomery, Alabama)
 Booker T. Washington High School (Tuskegee, Alabama)
 Booker T. Washington High School (Miami, Florida)
 Booker T. Washington High School (Pensacola, Florida)
 Booker T. Washington High School (Georgia), in Atlanta, Georgia
Booker T. Washington School (Terre Haute, Indiana)
 Booker T. Washington High School (New Orleans, Louisiana)
 Booker T. Washington High School (Shreveport, Louisiana)
 Booker T. Washington High School (Rocky Mount, North Carolina). now a community center
 Booker T. Washington High School (Oklahoma)
 Booker T. Washington High School (Columbia, South Carolina)
 Booker T. Washington High School (Tennessee), in Memphis, Tennessee
 Booker T. Washington High School for the Performing and Visual Arts (Dallas, Texas)
 Booker T. Washington High School (Houston, Texas)
 Booker T. Washington High School (Virginia), in Norfolk, Virginia
 Booker T. Washington Public Charter School (Washington, D.C.)

Past schools
 Booker T. Washington High School (El Dorado, Arkansas)
 Booker T Washington High School, (Jonesboro, Arkansas)
 Booker T. Washington School (Rushville, Indiana)
 Booker T. Washington School (Ashland, Kentucky)
 Booker T. Washington High School (West Virginia)

See also
 List of things named after Booker T. Washington
 Booker T. Washington School (disambiguation)
 Washington County High School (disambiguation)
 Washington High School (disambiguation)